Leonie Anne Hiscutt (born 14 January 1959) is an Australian politician, who has been a member of the Tasmanian Legislative Council for the division of Montgomery since 2013.

Hiscutt was a farmer and businesswoman prior to entering Parliament. She grew up in Elliott (near Yolla) and currently lives in Howth (near Penguin). Her husband's uncles, Des Hiscutt and Hugh Hiscutt were both previously members of the Tasmanian parliament.

References

External links

Living people
Members of the Tasmanian Legislative Council
Liberal Party of Australia members of the Parliament of Tasmania
1959 births
21st-century Australian politicians
21st-century Australian women politicians
Women members of the Tasmanian Legislative Council